Chrysolina herbacea, also known as the mint leaf beetle, or green mint beetle (in the UK), is a species of beetle in the family Chrysomelidae.

Description
The species is green, with black legs and antennae. Females can range in colour from green to purplish grey. It can be 8-10 mm long and has black coloured larvae, which also feed on mint leaves. They are active between May to September. 

Visually it may be confused with the much rarer tansy beetle (Chrysolina graminis).

Distribution
It can be found in Germany, Italy, Portugal, Great Britain, Ireland, the Caucasus, Turkey, and western Central Asia.

Habitat 
It prefers to live in damp riverside areas and in Marshy fields.

References

External links
Video of species mating

Beetles described in 1825
Chrysomelinae
Taxa named by Caspar Erasmus Duftschmid